Mordellistena conformis is a beetle in the genus Mordellistena of the family Mordellidae. It was described in 1883 by Smith.

References

conformis
Beetles described in 1883